Callao Township is an inactive township in Macon County, in the U.S. state of Missouri.

Callao Township takes its name from the community of Callao, Missouri.

References

Townships in Missouri
Townships in Macon County, Missouri